Lopi is knitting wool made from the fleece of Icelandic sheep. The fleece is made up of two layers, each with a different kind of wool. The wet-resistant outer coat contains long, coarse fibres, while the insulating layer beneath consists of soft, short fibres. These are processed together to create lopi roving and yarn.

The machine-carded roving is produced in disc-shaped rolls. This is the original unspun lopi first used for knitting c.1920s. More recently, lightly spun lopi yarn in different thicknesses has become available.

Most wool produced in Iceland is processed by Ístex, the Icelandic Textile Company. They manufacture 3 types of spun lopi yarn and also unspun lopi. It comes in a variety of natural fleece shades, and in a range of dyed colours. Lopi from local producers is also available, for instance in Þingborg near Selfoss.

Characteristic Icelandic lopapeysa sweaters are generally made from the thicker lopi yarns.

References
 History of lopi
 How is lopi yarn different from other knitting wool?
 (http://lopi.no)

External links
 Homepage of Ístex lopi producer
 Homepage of Þingborg lopi producer
 Homepage of Alafoss Wool Store
 Homepage of Shopicelandic Wool Store

Wool industry
Knitting
Yarn